Mother Easter Baptist Church and Parsonage is a historic site in Moultrie, Georgia. It was added to the National Register of Historic Places on April 1, 1999. It is located at 400 Second Avenue NW.

The church was built in 1906 and the parsonage was completed in 1941.

See also
National Register of Historic Places listings in Colquitt County, Georgia

References

Buildings and structures in Colquitt County, Georgia
Properties of religious function on the National Register of Historic Places in Georgia (U.S. state)
Baptist churches in Georgia (U.S. state)